Uska Bazar is a Nagar Panchayat and a small developing town in Siddharthnagar district of the Uttar Pradesh province of northern India, near the border with Nepal.

References 

Villages in Siddharthnagar district